99minutos is a last-mile logistics and online shipping company based in Mexico and offers logistic services for e-commerce businesses across Latin America.

History 
99minutos was founded by Alexis Patjane in 2014. The idea of founding the 99minutos was the result of a bad experience. It was in 2014 when Patjane visited a hookah bar with his friends and at the time, the charcoal was not available with them. They wanted to order it online but there was no service available at the time, therefore, he and his friends got an idea of establishing a company for delivering any kind of product in short time. They choose the name 99minutos as a slogan to deliver the product within 99 minutes wherever the consumer is. Currently 99minutos operates in Mexico, Peru, Colombia, and Chile.

Later with the expansion of outreach 99minutos they observed that it was not possible to deliver packages in every area within 99 minutes, that is where they introduced same-day delivery, next-day delivery, and Co2-free delivery and economy delivery.

Services 
The company offers five delivery options; same-day delivery, next-day delivery, and Co2-free delivery and economy delivery.

To fulfill these delivery systems 99minutos have founded the following services.

Fulfill99 
It was founded in 2021 for the purpose of warehousing and pick-pack.

Punto99 
It was founded in 2021 for the purpose of PUDO (Pick-Up & Drop Off) deliveries.

Ruta99 
It was founded in 2022 for the purpose of Digital portal for deliveries

Growth and expansion   
Currently 99minutos operates in Mexico, Chile, Peru and Colombia. With the new investments, 99minutos plan to expand its services to other countries of LatAM.

Currently 99minutos have teamed up with Amazon, Zara, Falabella, Marcado Libere, Decathlon. During 2020-2021, the company grew by 800% in Peru by delivering 1800 shipments on the first Monday of Covid-19 confinement.

In 2018, 99minutos introduced electric vehicles for deliveries in Latin America by collaborating with Engie. As of 2022, 99minutos has 70 electric vehicles in Mexico and around 30% fleet of vehicles in Chile are EVs.

As of July 2022, the company delivered around 16 million package per year.

Funding 
99minutos have so far backed $129 million in funding since its launch in 2014. In 2022, the company secured $82 million in series C funding from Oak HC/FT, Kaszek and Prosus Ventures.

References 

Logistics companies
Logistics companies by country
Online retailers by country
Online retailers